Viscount Templewood, of Chelsea in the County of Middlesex, was a title in the Peerage of the United Kingdom. It was created on 14 July 1944 for the Conservative politician and former Foreign Secretary and Home Secretary, Sir Samuel Hoare, 2nd Baronet. The Hoare Baronetcy, of Sidestrand Hall in the County of Norfolk, had been created in the Baronetage of the United Kingdom on 7 August 1899 for his father Samuel Hoare, who represented Norwich in the House of Commons. Both titles became extinct on Lord Templewood's death in 1959.

Hoare baronets, of Sidestrand Hall (1899)
Sir Samuel Hoare, 1st Baronet (1841–1915)
Sir Samuel John Gurney Hoare, 2nd Baronet (1880–1959) (created Viscount Templewood in 1944)

Viscounts Templewood (1944)
Samuel John Gurney Hoare, 1st Viscount Templewood (1880–1959)

See also
Hoare baronets
Samuel Hoare Jr

References

Extinct viscountcies in the Peerage of the United Kingdom
Noble titles created in 1944
Noble titles created for UK MPs